Wayne Panton is a politician, currently serving as Premier of the Cayman Islands.

Biography 
Panton is an attorney who served as a managing partner for Walkers. Before becoming Premier of the Cayman Islands, Wayne Panton, served as a Minister in the 2013–2017 PPM administration led by former Premier Alden McLaughlin.

References 

Living people
Premiers of the Cayman Islands
Government ministers of the Cayman Islands
Independent politicians of the Cayman Islands
Year of birth missing (living people)